Fifield is a village in the civil parish of Bray in the English county of Berkshire. The local pub is the Fifield Inn, which was refurbished in 2014.

Etymology
The name Fifield is from the Old English fīf + hīd, meaning '(estate of) five hides of land'.

Notable residents
 William Norreys of Fifield House (1523–1591), Usher of the Black Rod.
 Sir John Norreys of Fifield House (1547?–1612), son of the above and High Sheriff of Berkshire.

Transport 
The Courtney Buses 16A route passes through the village as do some school buses.

References

External links

Villages in Berkshire
Bray, Berkshire